Rehara is a village in Poonch District of Azad Kashmir. It is located about 11 miles northeast of Rawalakot, Azad Kashmir.

Poonch District, Pakistan